Ravan is a fictional DC Comics villain. His first appearance was in Suicide Squad #1 (1987), and was created by John Ostrander and Luke McDonnell.

Publication history
Ravan first appears as a member of the villainous mercenary team Jihad (renamed the Onslaught later). In an encounter with the Bronze Tiger his back was broken. He re-appears alongside the Onslaught in Suicide Squad #17, and is recruited for the Suicide Squad in his second encounter with the Bronze Tiger.

Fictional character biography
Part of the thuggee cult, handsome Indian playboy Ravan tries to stop the coming of Kali and thereby the Kali Yuga, the Age of Chaos, by killing for Kali. In doing so, he delays the coming of Kali for another thousand years. It is through this practice that he both prevents and worships Kali. His primary enemy is the villain Kobra, who wishes to bring forth the Age of Chaos.

Ravan joins the Suicide Squad so he can continue these efforts while actually being sponsored by the American government. He proceeds to develop a strange bond with Bronze Tiger, whom he swears to kill for his earlier defeats, but the two also form an effective team. During the Janus Directive, when Waller must make it seem like she is being controlled by Kobra, she sends the squad after the Force of July; Ravan kills Mayflower, a respected member of the Force of July.

Ravan becomes instrumental in Amanda Waller's plan to finish off the LOA, a drug-dealing organization. The villains' plan to expose the Squad succeeds, and it is revealed that Mr. Kale, who was seemingly the new boss, was just a front for Amanda Waller who had never left power.

With her superiors on the verge of disbanding the Suicide Squad, Amanda Waller gathers Ravan, Poison Ivy, and Deadshot in an assassination mission targeting the LOA, which is planning to create a zombie army. The deal for the villains is simple: the three will help Waller in killing the LOA and afterward they are set free.

The mission succeeds, and Amanda Waller goes to jail on charges of murder, while Ravan leaves for London, where he sets up a 'cyberchurch' as a front for his assassination organization. A year later, Batman kidnaps Ravan from this 'church' (blowing it up in the process) for the new Suicide Squad, again run by Amanda Waller.

With this Squad, Ravan goes to Israel to capture Kobra, but Kobra has already been captured by the Israeli government's superteam the Hayoth. Ravan easily manipulates one of their agents, thereby giving him access to their highly advanced A.I. computer Dybbuk. While Kobra's plans are being thwarted by the rest of the Suicide Squad, Ravan faces Kobra in combat, but Kobra has the upper hand and is close to killing Ravan.

At the last moment, the third Atom appears on the scenes, striking down Kobra. Ravan's last wish is for either him or the Atom to kill Kobra, but Atom denies him that final wish, and as Ravan himself says, he dies unfulfilled in Suicide Squad #47. According to Suicide Squad (vol. 2) #11, however, Ravan is incapacitated rather than deceased, as is shown on a computer screen being viewed by the second Rustam. Assuming this is true, Ravan nevertheless dies for certain sometime thereafter, though the details are not currently known.

During the events of Blackest Night, Ravan's corpse is reanimated as a member of the Black Lantern Corps alongside several other fallen Suicide Squad members. Ravan is apparently destroyed by the Manhunter's self-destruct mechanism when it unleashes an explosion of Green Lantern energy that eradicates the Black Lanterns.

Other versions
A character named Ravan Nassar appears in Arrow Season 2.5 Comics: "Haunted", "Gone", Blood part 11 and 12 and "Assault". In 2012, Kahndaq was liberated by A.R.G.U.S. and a multitude of soldiers, leading to the imprisonment of Ravan at Guantanamo Bay detention camp and a lot of sectarian violence. Two years later, an extremist sect named Onslaught began kidnapping and murdering, leading to Lyla Michaels asking Ravan to join the Suicide Squad. Ravan was cleaned up and given clothes and weapons. As they were ready to leave, John Diggle showed up to join them. As they were preparing to drop above the Sinai Peninsula, Diggle questioned Nassar as to what piqued his interest in the mission, considering the nature of the others' membership, being chided for his previous actions as the country's head of military. Once on the ground, they snuck in to the nearby city. They ambushed extremists in the midst of an execution and Ravan, contrary to their initial plans, planted an IED device on one of their trucks, leaving only one, badly-burnt survivor. They took him to a house, tying him up and interrogating him. They requested to know where the resistance leader Khem-Adam was, but he claimed to have no idea. He refused to give up the location, until Diggle intervened, instead talking to him rather than torturing. Being told the Amon-Shu Caves, they rode on camelback, finishing the journey on foot. They broke through in to the caves, fighting off Khem-Adam and his men. However, before Nassar could take on Khem-Adam, a former soldier under his command, he was stopped by two arrows from Nyssa al Ghul, who took Khem-Adam. With Bronze Tiger killed, they escaped to return home. Ravan was returned to his cell at Guantanamo Bay, believing that he had to pay for his past crimes.

In the Injustice: Gods Among Us reality, Ravan is a prisoner in the underwater facility called The Trench.

In other media
 Ravan makes a cameo appearance in the Arrow episode "Unthinkable", portrayed by Viv Leacock. This version is a reserve member of the A.R.G.U.S. Squad.

References

Comics characters introduced in 1987
DC Comics martial artists
DC Comics supervillains
Fictional assassins in comics
Fictional Indian people
Characters created by John Ostrander
Works based on the Ramayana